Samir Bajtarević (born 20 April 1969) is a Bosnian retired football player. He was elected a delegate of the FA of Zenica-Doboj Canton at the Football Association of Bosnia and Herzegovina in January 2015.

International career
Bajtarević made four appearances for Bosnia and Herzegovina, all at the 1997 Dunhill Cup in Kuala Lumpur. His final international was against China.

References

External links

Profile - NFSBIH

1969 births
Living people
Association football midfielders
Bosnia and Herzegovina footballers
Bosnia and Herzegovina international footballers
FK Rudar Ugljevik players
Premier League of Bosnia and Herzegovina players